Anacithara platycheila is a species of sea snail, a marine gastropod mollusk in the family Horaiclavidae.

Description
The length of the ovate, dirty white shell attains 6.5 mm, its diameter  mm. It contains  whorls. The outer lip is conspicuously thin, very dilated laterally and slightly sinuate on top. The columella has a slight callus. The open siphonal canal is very short. The single reddish-brown band around the body whorl and the broadly expanded lip at once mark the distinctness of this species. The maculations near the suture are about three on a whorl.

References

External links
  Tucker, J.K. 2004 Catalog of recent and fossil turrids (Mollusca: Gastropoda). Zootaxa 682:1–1295.
 Biolib: Anacithara platycheila

platycheila
Gastropods described in 1882